This article is about the fishes found in Metropolitan France. For the fishes in the French Overseas territories, see : List of fish of French Guiana, List of fish of French Polynesia, List of fish of Martinique, List of fish of Réunion, List of fish of Guadeloupe, List of fish of Mayotte.

Species include:
 Esox lucius, the northern pike
 Alburnus alburnus, the bleak

See also 
 Fauna of Metropolitan France

France
France
Fish
Fish